The name Paolo has been used for two tropical cyclones in the Philippines by the PAGASA in the Western Pacific Ocean. It replaced the retired name Pepeng in 2009.

 Typhoon Wutip (2013) (T1321, 20W, Paolo) – formed near the western Philippines and made landfall in northern Vietnam.
 Typhoon Lan (2017) (T1721, 25W, Paolo) – a very large and strong typhoon that impacted Japan.

Pacific typhoon set index articles